The 28th Goya Awards were presented at the Madrid Marriott Auditorium Hotel in Madrid on February 9, 2014 to honour the best in Spanish films of 2013. Manel Fuentes was the master of ceremonies for the first time. Nominees were announced on January 7, 2014.Living Is Easy with Eyes Closed won six awards, including Best Film, Best Director, Best Actor and Best Original Screenplay, but Witching and Bitching won the most awards, with eight awards, including Best Supporting Actress.

Winners and nominees

Major awards

Other award nominees

Honorary Goya
Jaime de Armiñán

References

External links
Official site

28
2013 film awards
2013 in Spanish cinema
2014 in Madrid